Siena–Ampugnano Airport  was a small military airfield in Ampugnano, near Siena, in Tuscany, Italy. All employment has been terminated in 2014.

2008 the site has been proposed for a new international airport capable of handling 4 million passengers a year by 2020. Since 2003 the project has met widespread local opposition. Upon request about current status and future of the airport in November 2016 the Siena Comune confirmed by eMail: ″the airport of Siena is not operating″. As of January 2017, the field is mentioned as being operated by Sky Services. There are however indications of rather high rates, opposed to limited levels of service.

History
During World War II, the facility was known as Malignano Airfield.  It was a major United States Air Force Twelfth Air Force base of operations during the Italian Campaign.

Facilities

References

External links
 Official website: English, Italian
 

Airports in Italy
Airfields of the United States Army Air Forces in Italy
Buildings and structures in Siena
Transport in Tuscany
Airports established in 1932